Stanley Proffitt (8 October 1910 – 3 January 1999) was an English cricketer.  Proffitt was a left-handed batsman who bowled slow left-arm orthodox.  He was born at Oldham, Lancashire.

Despite being born in Lancashire, it was for Essex that he made his first-class debut for against Sussex in the 1937 County Championship.  He made six further first-class appearances in that season, the last of which came against Gloucestershire.  In his seven first-class matches, he scored 170 runs at a batting average of 12.14, with a high score of 39.

Outside of cricket, he represented England at table tennis.  He died at Middleton, Lancashire, on 3 January 1999.

See also
 List of England players at the World Team Table Tennis Championships

References

External links

1910 births
1999 deaths
People from Oldham
English cricketers
Essex cricketers
English male table tennis players